Mikhail Olegovich Biryukov (born October 13, 1985) is a Russian professional ice hockey goaltender, who is currently an unrestricted free agent. He most recently played with HC Vityaz in the Kontinental Hockey League (KHL). He joined Vityaz after a second stint with Torpedo Nizhny Novgorod in the KHL.

Biryukov played for the Russia national ice hockey team for the 2007 IIHF World Championship.

References

External links

1985 births
Living people
Russian ice hockey goaltenders
HC CSKA Moscow players
HC Dynamo Moscow players
HC MVD players
Metallurg Novokuznetsk players
Molot-Prikamye Perm players
Torpedo Nizhny Novgorod players
HC Vityaz players
HC Yugra players
Sportspeople from Yaroslavl